General George Bernard (died May 1820) was a British Army officer.

Military career
Bernard was appointed a captain in the 6th (Inniskilling) Dragoons on 7 July 1774 and then promoted to major in the 20th Light Dragoons on 3 December 1782 and to lieutenant colonel in the 86th Regiment of Foot on 8 April 1783. 

He became Lieutenant-Governor of Kinsale and Charles Fort on 30 December 1786. He raised the 84th Regiment of Foot on 2 November 1793 and was appointed its lieutenant colonel commandant on 1 March 1794 before being promoted to full colonel on 15 March 1794. He was promoted to major-general on 14 May 1796, lieutenant-general on 1 October 1803 and to full general on 4 June 1813.

He lived at Heaton Lodge in Kirkheaton.

References

British Army generals
1820 deaths
6th (Inniskilling) Dragoons officers
20th Light Dragoons officers
84th Regiment of Foot officers